The 2011–12 Eastern Michigan Eagles men's basketball team represented Eastern Michigan University during the 2011–12 NCAA Division I men's basketball season. The Eagles, led by first year head coach Rob Murphy, played their home games at the Eastern Michigan University Convocation Center and were members of the West Division of the Mid-American Conference. They finished the season 14–18, 9–7 in MAC play to finish in first place in the West Division. It was the Eagles first MAC West title. However, the Eagles lost in the first round of the MAC tournament by Northern Illinois.

Roster
Source:

Schedule

|-
!colspan=9 style=| Regular season

|-
!colspan=9 style=|MAC tournament

Awards 
MAC Coach Of The Year
 Rob Murphy
3rd Team All MAC
 Darrell Lampley

References

Eastern Michigan Eagles men's basketball seasons
Eastern Michigan
Eastern Michigan Eagles men's basketball
Eastern Michigan Eagles men's basketball